Christians Against Poverty (CAP) is a Christian charitable company in the United Kingdom founded in Bradford, West Yorkshire by John Kirkby in 1996. It is a national organisation specialising in debt counselling for people in financial difficulty, including those in need of bankruptcy or insolvency. It also provides Job Clubs for those seeking employment, Life Skills groups helping people with practical skills to survive on a low income and Fresh Start Courses for people looking to overcome addictions and dependencies.

In December 2011 Christians Against Poverty were granted their own Group Licence by the Office of Fair Trading alongside other leading debt counselling bodies, such as CAB and Advice UK. With the authority to oversee more than 50,000 consumer credit companies, the Financial Conduct Authority (FCA) replaced the Office of Fair Trading in 2014. In 2017, the FCA gave Christians Against Poverty full authorization.

Services 
Christians Against Poverty offers several different services. Since the organisation was founded in 1996, it has been best known for offering free debt counselling. The organisation works through a network of regional offices that exist in partnership with a local Christian church. Individuals seeking the assistance of the charity give authority to the charity to negotiate with creditors, and the charity will then organise the individual's finances with the objective of making them debt free within 5 years. The debt advisor will create a sustainable personal budget for clients, prioritising basic living needs and offering creditors fair, affordable pro-rata payments as far as this is possible.

In 2013, CAP launched Job Clubs, a service targeted at the unemployed. In 2014, CAP started running Release Groups (now called Fresh Start) for people seeking to overcome addictions and dependencies. Groups run a course based on the Twelve Steps and offer one to one coaching for all members. In 2015 CAP launched Life Skills, teaching practical skills to survive life on a low income.

CAP also runs the CAP Money Course to teach budgeting skills. The course exists in a number of variations, tailored to children, young people, students and adults.

Recognition 
The charity has won a number of awards, including "Debt Advice Provider of the Year" at the 2015 Collections and Customer Service Awards, the "Martin Williams Award for Contribution to the Credit Industry" at the 2014 Credit Today Awards, as well as Charity Times Awards' "Best Charity to Work For" in 2006 and 2007. CAP came top in "the UK's Best Small Company to Work For" in the Sunday Times' Best Companies list on its debut in 2008, and topped the list again in 2009. CAP's founder, John Kirkby, received a CBE in 2018 for his services.

The Right Honourable Justin Welby, Archbishop of Canterbury, became patron of the charity in May 2015.

In October 2018, CAP was featured in the BBC Two documentary 'The Debt Saviours', questioning whether the charity's true motivation is debt relief or merely more so a means to recruit people over to Jesus / Christianity.

Funding 
CAP is funded by donations from individuals, churches, charities and trusts. CAP also operates a Fair Share scheme, whereby banks and other financial organisations donate to CAP 10% of the value of repayments made to them by CAP clients. These donations are made with no strings attached.

International 

CAP has expanded into various other countries, namely Australia in 2001, New Zealand in 2007, and Canada in 2013. CAP UK, CAP Australia, CAP New Zealand and CAP Canada are each separate and independent charities, but work on the same principles and systems.

CAP also expanded into the United States in January 2019, based in the Chicago area.

Countries where CAP operates

References

External links
CAP UK
CAP Australia
CAP New Zealand
 CAP Canada

Christian charities based in the United Kingdom
Charities based in West Yorkshire
Organisations based in Bradford
Debt
Advice organizations
Poverty activism
Poverty and religion